Lugin or Luhin (. from луг meaning meadow) is a Russian masculine surname, its feminine counterpart is Lugina or Luhina. It may refer to
Alejandro Pérez Lugín (1870–1926), Spanish writer and film director
Andrey Luhin (born 1959), Belarusian rower
Dmitri Lugin (born 1990), Russian ice hockey winger
Olga Lugina (born 1974), Ukrainian tennis player

Russian-language surnames